Tales of Halloween is a 2015 American comedy horror anthology film consisting of ten interlocking segments, each revolving around the titular holiday. Segments were directed by Neil Marshall, Darren Lynn Bousman, Axelle Carolyn, Lucky McKee, Andrew Kasch, Paul Solet, John Skipp, Adam Gierasch, Jace Anderson, Mike Mendez, Ryan Schifrin, Dave Parker and, in his film debut, Jack Dylan Grazer.

The film premiered on July 24, 2015, at the Fantasia International Film Festival, before receiving a limited theatrical release and through video on demand on October 16, 2015, by Epic Pictures.

Synopsis

Sweet Tooth
Written and directed by Dave Parker.

Having just finished trick-or-treating, Mikey comes home with a bag full of candy. His parents have left him in the care of babysitter Lizzy, who has invited her boyfriend Kyle over to watch a horror movie. As Mikey begins to enjoy his candy, Lizzy and Kyle advise him to leave some for "Sweet Tooth". Not knowing who Sweet Tooth is, the teens offer to share the urban legend of the mysterious figure: fifty years ago, Timothy Blake, a boy who loved trick-or-treating but had never been allowed candy by his parents who claimed it would make him fat and lazy, discovered his parents eating his Halloween haul. Enraged, Timothy killed them with a meat cleaver and ate all the candy. Wanting more, he then cut his parents open and ate the candy in their stomachs. Every Halloween since, "Sweet Tooth", his murderous spirit, roams the neighborhood looking for candy. That is why children have to leave some candy to share with Sweet Tooth, or he will rip open their stomachs and take what is inside. Rattled by the story, Mikey decides to go to sleep early. Despite Lizzy telling him Sweet Tooth is only a story, he leaves a candy bar by the door. Lizzy and Kyle decide to make out and eat the candy, but upon eating all of it, they are attacked by Sweet Tooth himself. He goes toward Mikey's bedroom, but spares him after taking the candy bar he left. Later, Mikey's parents come home to find Lizzy and Kyle's corpses and their son standing nearby, exclaiming that they ate all his Halloween candy. It is revealed in "Bad Seed" that Mikey is believed to have murdered Lizzy and Kyle himself and was arrested.

The Night Billy Raised Hell
Written by Clint Sears, directed by Darren Lynn Bousman.

Billy Thompson, dressed as a red devil and accompanied by his older sister Britney and her boyfriend Todd, tries to begin trick-or-treating early in the afternoon. The two teens trick Billy into playing a prank that, according to them, has been going on for years. They prepare an egg for Billy to throw at the house of Mr. Abbadon, a notoriously stingy resident of the neighborhood who has never given out any candy over the years. Before Billy can throw the egg, he is caught red-handed by Mr. Abbadon, who takes the egg and throws it at Todd as he and Britney flee. Billy is ushered into Mr. Abbadon's house, which is decorated with occult paraphernalia, and where Mr. Abbadon is revealed to be a demon. Tired of children pranking his house year after year, he tells the terrified Billy that he is going to teach him what a real Halloween prank is. To that end, Mr. Abbadon and Billy go around the neighborhood and play various twisted "pranks" throughout the town, ranging from spray-painting walls to stabbing a dentist neighbor who gives Billy a toothbrush instead of candy, then later tricking the same dentist into stepping onto a bear trap. The duo even hijack Adrianne Curry's car along the way, using it to run down trick or treaters and rob a convenience store. After all the mischief, Mr. Abbadon returns to his house and greets Billy, who is revealed to have actually been tied up the entire time. The person wearing Billy's devil costume is a miniature demon known as Mordecai. Satisfied with the night's events, Mr. Abbadon lets Billy go, only for Billy to be surrounded by police officers waiting for him outside for the reign of terror Mordecai caused disguised as him. A terrified Billy puts his hands in the air and pees his pants, the disgusted police officers mocking Billy for it just before they shoot him dead.

Trick
Written by Greg Commons, directed by Adam Gierasch.

On a seemingly peaceful Halloween night, close friends Nelson, Maria, James and Caitlyn are lounging around Nelson's house, smoking pot, giving out candy, and watching Night of the Living Dead. As Nelson goes to greet a female trick-or-treater dressed as a witch, the girl suddenly stabs him multiple times in the abdomen, gravely injuring him. Frightened, Maria goes to her car to drive Nelson to the hospital, only to be grievously attacked by four more kids in costumes. Maria attempts to flee, but she succumbs to her injuries and drops dead in the house's pool. By this time, Nelson has succumbed to his injuries as well. James tries to find help, only to have his face burned by yet another trick-or-treater, who completes their attack by stuffing his mouth with rat poison. Caitlyn, the only adult left, flees to the backyard, where she hides in the pool house. Looking through pictures on her phone, it is revealed that Caitlyn, Nelson, Maria, and James are actually a group of psychopaths who have been kidnapping kids and torturing them for their twisted amusement. The vigilante kids find the pool house, which turns out to be the place the foursome tortured the previous kids and houses an assortment of blood-stained surgical tools. The kids free the group's most recent victim, a girl whose eye has been gouged by the adults, then corner Caitlyn. The freed girl wishes Caitlyn a happy Halloween before killing her with an axe to the head.

The Weak and the Wicked
Written by Molly Millions, directed by Paul Solet.

Alice, a sociopathic, leather-clad, pyromaniac bully, along with her lackeys Isaac and Bart, corner a trick-or-treater lost in an alleyway. Before Alice can extinguish her cigar on the kid's foot, she and her goons are interrupted by a teenager dressed as some sort of creature. The teenager hands Alice a drawing of the creature, referred to as "The Demon of All Hallows Eve", warning Alice that the Demon will "spill the blood of the wicked where the wicked have harmed the weak". Alice dismisses the drawing, then orders Isaac and Bart to join her in pursuing the teenager as he makes a run for it. The trio chase the teenager to the other side of the neighborhood, where the teen stops by a burnt-down trailer car. In a flashback to when Alice, Bart, and Isaac were children, it is revealed that Alice intentionally set the trailer, which the teenager used to live in, on fire, with his parents inside it. When the bullies show up, they recognize the teen as Jimmy Henson, before proceeding to beat him up. As Alice douses Jimmy in vodka and prepares to light him on fire, Bart and Isaac are suddenly pulled into the shadows by an unseen force. When Alice turns around, the actual Demon of All Hallow's Eve has shown up, looking exactly like Jimmy's costume (a flashback reveals that the drawing Alice dropped also contained instructions on how to summon it). Alice is brutally killed by the Demon, her blood violently splashing on Jimmy, who smiles in satisfaction.

Grim Grinning Ghost
Written and directed by Axelle Carolyn.

Lynn attends her mother's Halloween party. While there, Lynn listens as her mother recounts the story of Mary Bailey, a girl who was mocked all her life for her disfigured physical appearance. As a ghost, Mary rises from the grave every Halloween to laugh at people's appearances behind their backs, as well as take the eyes of those who turn around to look at her. On her way home, Lynn's old car breaks down in the middle of the road. She attempts to fix the engine herself, but in the process, slams the car's hood on her phone, breaking it and leaving her unable to call for help. Forced to finish her trip home on foot, Lynn soon hears sinister cackling in the distance. It is gradually revealed that a shadowy figure, possibly Mary Bailey's ghost, is following her. Terrified, but also remembering her mother's story, Lynn makes a run for it to evade the spirit, and manages not to turn around to see who might be following her. Lynn manages to reach the safety of her house, whereupon she turns around to see nothing, leaving her to believe the spirit has not followed her. As Lynn settles onto her couch to watch a movie, her dog suddenly gets nervous and leaves the room. Not minding her dog's behavior, Lynn smiles and leans back to the couch in satisfaction, only to find Mary Bailey sitting beside her.

Ding Dong
Written and directed by Lucky McKee.

One year ago, married couple Jack and Bobbie watch as children trick or treat on Halloween night. Bobbie is distraught by the fact she has no children of her own, prompting Jack to try and cheer her up by dressing their dog as Gretel. Suddenly angered at the gesture, Bobbie transforms into her true form, a red-skinned demonic witch with multiple arms, and proceeds to claw at Jack's face. In the present day, an enthusiastic Bobbie and a submissive Jack have prepared a routine to perform for trick-or-treaters, dressed as Hansel and the witch from Hansel and Gretel respectively. Even though everything goes normally, with Bobbie repeatedly performing the skit for the children (including children from the other stories of the film), there is a sense of uneasiness between the couple every time children arrive on their front porch. When a young boy also dressed as Hansel visits the couple's house by himself, Bobbie prepares to lead him inside. Jack alerts the boy's mother, who is looking for him. Jack informs Bobbie that he secretly underwent a vasectomy to prevent a pregnancy, believing that his wife is far too abusive and unstable to properly care for a child. Upon hearing this, Bobbie snaps, and proceeds to transform back into her witch form. She captures Jack and throws him into the house's oven, which resembles a cavernous inferno. After doing so, she ends up melting and perishing.

This Means War
Written and directed by Andrew Kasch and John Skipp.

Boris has proudly finished decorating his house for Halloween, setting up a classic, graveyard themed display, complete with an animatronic talking skeleton. When children are about to observe his decorations, they are scared away from the place by blaring rock music. The music is revealed to come from the house of Boris' new neighbor, Dante, a punk rock enthusiast who has set up a far more gruesome and gore-oriented set of decorations on his own house. Boris walks up to Dante's yard to ask him to turn the volume lower, as well as get his scantily clad girlfriend to put on some more clothes, but Dante and his colleagues just tell him to "chill" and tell him that his decorations look "cute". Taking Dante's words as criticism and mockery, an angered Boris retaliates by wrecking the sound system, putting a halt to the music. In exchange, Dante exacts revenge by using a baseball bat to knock off the head of Boris' talking skeleton. As Dante prepares to throw a huge bucket of fake blood onto the rest of Boris' slick Halloween decorations, Boris runs up to stop him, causing the latter to splash the blood on the former instead. Spectators (including characters from the other stories in the film) begin to crowd as the two neighbors engage in a fistfight, placing bets and egging them on until the police arrive. Eventually, Boris shoves Dante towards a sharp piece of standing wood, left over from the wrecked decorations. In the end, both Boris and Dante are impaled on the piece of wood, killing both of them instantly and shocking the crowd.

Friday the 31st
Written by Mike Mendez and Dave Parker, directed by Mike Mendez.

Deep in the woods, a deformed serial killer who resembles Jason Voorhees hunts down a teenage girl dressed as Dorothy for Halloween. The girl runs to a barn where she discovers several of the killer's dismembered victims, among them her friend Casey. The killer tracks her to the barn, and when she manages to escape and flee, he kills her by throwing a spear through her chest. As the killer celebrates his most recent slaying, a UFO suddenly appears overhead. The ship beams down a small, costumed alien that tries to trick-or-treat. Unable to persuade the constantly repeating alien that he has no candy to give, the frustrated killer proceeds to stomp on the alien, seemingly crushing him. As the killer walks back to his barn, the alien's remains slither into the girl's mouth and possess her body. The possessed girl proceeds to chase the frightened killer into his barn. From there, the possessed girl and the killer then proceed to attack each other with a meat cleaver and a chainsaw, respectively. Their duel eventually concludes with both of them decapitating each other. The alien then crawls out of the girl's severed head through the mouth and teleports back to the spaceship, taking the killer's head with him as his "treat".

The Ransom of Rusty Rex
Written and directed by Ryan Schifrin.

Bank robber Hank and his partner Dutch, lounging in their van, spot millionaire Jebediah Rex letting his son Rusty go out for trick-or-treating. Seeing this, the two set out on a plan to kidnap the millionaire's son and hold him for ransom. After succeeding in capturing Rusty, the kidnappers tie him into a chair and call his father. However, Jebediah seems not to express fear about the fact that his son has been kidnapped, tells the kidnappers that they have made a terrible mistake, and promptly hangs up the phone. Hank calls him again in an attempt to discuss the ransom, but Jebediah coldly tells them they can have his son. Exasperated, the kidnappers eventually find out that Rusty is actually a malicious, cat-like imp that clings to the people near him. After the criminals engage in a vicious fight with Rusty, they capture him, tie him up, and prepare to throw him in a nearby swamp. Dutch is briefly fooled when Rusty begins emitting the cries of a child, only for the imp to spew bile at his face when he checks on him. After returning to their lair, Hank and Dutch discover that Rusty has followed them. As Rusty attacks Dutch, Hank calls Jebediah once more, who informs him that Rusty is not his son. He came to Jebediah's doorstep five years ago disguised as a trick-or-treater and has been holding Jebediah and his wife hostage ever since. Thanking the kidnappers for freeing him from Rusty, Jebediah warns them to remember to feed Rusty, otherwise "he will eat". Hank and Dutch once again tie up Rusty, and this time, they deliver him to Jebediah's doorstep and set him on fire. Sometime later, as Hank comes back from buying food from a convenience store (the same one featured earlier), he finds Rusty in the backseat, feasting on Dutch's severed head.

Bad Seed
Written and directed by Neil Marshall.

Ray is seen carving pumpkins in his kitchen as his wife Ellen appreciates his work. When she leaves the room and comes back in, changed into her cat costume, she watches as the latest pumpkin her husband carved suddenly comes to life and bites his head off, before growing spider-like roots for legs and fleeing out the back door. Detective McNally is called in to investigate the crime scene (as most of the police department are busy dealing with the emergencies portrayed earlier in the film). At first, she refuses to believe the description of the victim's killer, but is proven wrong after forensic analyst Bob confirms the killer was indeed a carved pumpkin. Meanwhile, the pumpkin proceeds to disguise itself among the jack o' lanterns on a nearby porch, where it eats a trick-or-treater. At the police station, McNally meets with her superior, Captain J.G. Zimmerman, to discuss the situation. After mentioning that the town goes crazy every Halloween (showcasing reports describing incidents from earlier in the film), Zimmerman assigns McNally to track down the pumpkin before it can do any more damage. While driving, McNally finally discovers the pumpkin as it terrorizes the neighborhood. McNally manages to track it down to a backyard, where it disguises itself among several other pumpkins. When it discovers McNally, the pumpkin attempts to move in for the kill. When McNally runs out of bullets, Bob arrives and tosses McNally a shotgun, allowing her to destroy it. McNally finds a sticker on a broken piece of the pumpkin, revealing that it comes from a company known as Clover Corp, advertised as a "100% organic super-pumpkin". McNally and Bob visit the Clover Corp. headquarters and meet with professor Milo Gottlieb with a search warrant. Gottlieb takes them to a warehouse where they discover thousands of genetically modified pumpkins; all potentially dangerous, all waiting to be sold.

Cast

Wraparound 

 Adrienne Barbeau as D.J.

Sweet Tooth:
 Hunter Smith as "Sweet Tooth"
 Cameron Easton as Timothy Blake
 Caroline Williams as Mrs. Blake
 Robert Rusler as Mr. Blake
 Clare Kramer as Lieutenant Brandt-Mathis
 Greg Grunberg as Alex Mathis
 Austin Falk as Kyle
 Madison Iseman as Lizzy
 Daniel DiMaggio as Mikey

The Night Billy Raised Hell:
 Barry Bostwick as Mr. Abbadon
 Marcus Eckert as Billy
 Christophe Zajac-Denek as Mordecai / Little Devil
 Ben Stillwell as Todd
 Natalis Castillo as Britney
 Adam Pascal as The Dentist
 Adrianne Curry as herself
 Rafael Jordan as Alien

Trick:
 John F. Beach as James
 Tiffany Shepis as Maria
 Casey Ruggieri as Catilyn
 Trent Haaga as Nelson
 Marnie McKendry as Princess
 Rebekah McKendry as Mother
 Mia Page as Girl / Witch
 Clayton Keller as Alien
 Sage Stewart as Devil Girl

The Weak and the Wicked:
 Keir Gilchrist as Jimmy Henson
 Grace Phipps as Alice
 Booboo Stewart as Isaac
 Noah Segan as Bart
 Jack Dylan Grazer as Younger Jimmy Henson
 Katie Silverman as Younger Alice
 Matt Merchant as Demon

Grin Grimming Ghosts:
 Alex Essoe as Lynn / Victorian Woman
 Lin Shaye as Lynn's Mother / Pirate
 Liesel Hanson as Mary Bailey
 Barbara Crampton as Witch
 Lisa Marie as Victorian Widow
 Mick Garris as Erik, The Phantom of The Opera
 Stuart Gordon as Sherlock Holmes
 Anubis as Baby

Ding Dong:
 Marc Senter as Jack
 Pollyanna McIntosh as Bobbie
 Lily Von Woodenshoe as Gretel
 Vanessa Menendez as Lone Child's Mother
 Lucas Armandaris as Lone Child
 Daniel DiMaggio as Mikey
 Mia Page as Girl / Witch
 Sage Stewart as Devil Girl
 Ben Woolf as Rex "Rusty Rex"
 Aidan Gail as Child Fireman
 Mo Meinhart as Witch
 Gavin Keathley as Child Jake Gyllenhaal
 Felissa Rose as Parent

This Means War:
 Dana Gould as Boris
 James Duval as Dante
 Elissa Dowling as Velma
 Graham Denman as "Ziggy"
 Thomas Blake Jr. as Axl
 Sean Clark as Tytan
 Buz Wallick as Danzy
 Joshua Lou Friedman as Butch
 Jennifer Wenger as Vicki
 Michael Monterastelli as Goober
 Graham Skipper as Officer Hellman
 Adam Green as Officer Carlo
 Lombardo Boyar as Gambling Neighbor
 Cody Goodfellow as Drunken Neighbor
 Frank Blocker as Judge Moustache
 Andy Merrill as Neighbor
 Frank Dietz as Neighbor
 Noel Jason Scott as Nosferatu
 Shaked Berenson as Detective / Masked Wrestler

Friday the 31st:
 Amanda Moyer as Dorothy
 Jennifer Wenger as Possessed Dorothy
 Nick Principe as The Killer

The Ransom of Rusty Rex:
 John Landis as Jebediah Rex
 Ben Woolf as Rex "Rusty Rex"
 Jose Pablo Cantillo as "Dutch"
 Sam Witwer as Hank

Bad Seed:
 Kristina Klebe as Detective McNally
 Pat Healy as Bob "Forensic Bob"
 Greg McLean as Ray Bishop
 Cerina Vincent as Ellen Bishop
 John Savage as Captain J.G. Zimmerman
 Dana Renee Ashmore as Coroner #1
 Dylan Struzan as Coroner #2
 Drew Struzan as "Rembrandt"
 Nicole Laino as Cheryl
 Aidan Gail as Kevin
 Graham Skipper as Officer Hellman
 Adam Green as Officer Carlo
 Monette Moio as Cheerleader Girl
 Noah Nevins as Cheerleader's Boyfriend
 Joe Dante as Professor Milo Gottleib
 Alexandra Fritz as Pirate

Production
Tales of Halloween was conceived by filmmaker Axelle Carolyn, who garnered a slew of directors to make a Halloween-centric film taking place in the "same town on the same night". Carolyn was at a birthday party when she pitched the film to Adam Gierasch and Andrew Kasch. Kasch would then bring along his collaborator John Skipp to work with him on This Means War. Mike Mendez, director of The Convent, signed onto the film a month later and helped secure a deal with Epic Pictures Group. Joe Begos was brought onto the project and wrote a script, but would drop out to direct The Mind's Eye. Begos was replaced by Lucky McKee, who was flown out to Los Angeles to direct his segment. Mendez's short, Friday the 31st, was actually the opening to a film he co-wrote with Dave Parker 18 years prior, called Dead Stuff. Darren Lynn Bousman used a script from his colleague Clint Sears and reassembled his crew from The Devil's Carnival. Gierasch, writer of films Mortuary and Crocodile, first pitched a romantic short which would be rejected by Carolyn. For Ryan Schifrin's short, The Ransom of Rusty Rex, actor John Landis had assisted Schifrin after editing was completed by giving notes. Bousman and Neil Marshall shot their segments in the matter of two days.

Greg Grunberg and Clare Kramer reprise their characters from Big Ass Spider!.

Release
The film had its premiere at the Fantasia International Film Festival in Montreal on July 24, 2015. It was also selected as the opening-night film at Wizard World Chicago as well as London FrightFest Film Festival, where it closed the annual event on August 31, 2015, tying with its European premiere. The film was released in a limited release and through video on demand on October 16, 2015.

Reception
Reception for Tales of Halloween has been positive, with Rotten Tomatoes certifying it "fresh" with a 77% rating. The site's consensus reads, "Tales Of Halloween boasts a number of fun scares and is overall more consistent than many horror anthology films, even if it isn't quite as dark or nasty as the classics of the genre."

Michael Gingold, writing for Fangoria, called it "Well-produced on its modest budget", and gave it three and a half out of four skulls. Kalyn Corrigan of Bloody Disgusting called it "a fun, exuberant addition to the subgenre of horror anthology films." Katie Rife of The A.V. Club gave it a "B" saying the film "might make it a new annual tradition in horror-loving households." Rob Hunter of Film School Rejects wrote "Tales of Halloween is good fun, but it’s difficult not to wish that more of the stories had aimed for darker, more terrifying and affecting goals. Still, the EC Comics attitude finds a new home with Carolyn and her crew, and with any luck the film will spawn a new Halloween tradition of fun, gory, spooky anthology films highlighted by short, messy bursts of genre talent."

Dennis Harvey of Variety gave the film a mixed review, calling the segments "polished enough but utterly routine" and saying "Even the best of these, however, are held back by brevity from developing silly ideas into anything truly memorable."

References

External links

2015 films
2015 comedy horror films
American comedy horror films
American ghost films
American monster movies
American slasher films
American supernatural horror films
Demons in film
The Devil in film
Films about bullying
Films about extraterrestrial life
Films based on Hansel and Gretel
Films scored by Joseph Bishara
American horror anthology films
Mariticide in fiction
Matricide in fiction
Patricide in fiction
American serial killer films
Films about witchcraft
Halloween horror films
American exploitation films
American splatter films
American science fiction horror films
2010s English-language films
Films directed by Dave Parker